The Statists were a conservative political faction in the United Belgian States during the Brabant Revolution (1789–1790). They were led by Henri Van der Noot and fiercely opposed to the more radical "Vonckist" faction, led by Jan Frans Vonck.

History
The Statists initially tried to bring about a revocation of the reforms of the Habsburg Emperor Joseph II which they perceived as an attack on regional freedom. In 1787 they organized a wave of uprisings and rioting known as the Small Revolution and the resulting crackdown by the Austrian forces forced Van der Noot and his Statists into exile in the Dutch Republic. Statists supported Belgian independence but their main area of concern was protecting the local privileges and the Catholic Church. After the proclamation of the United States of Belgium, the Statist managed to exclude the Vonckists from government and forced them into exile. The new Belgian state was short-lived as Habsburg rule was restored at the end of 1790, forcing the Statists from power.

References

United Belgian States
Catholicism in Belgium
Republicanism in Belgium